A status referendum was held on the island of Bonaire on 10 September 2004. A majority voted for integration into the Netherlands.

Background
After the 1994 referendum came out in favour of maintaining and restructuring the Netherlands Antilles, the government of the Netherlands Antilles tried to restructure the Netherlands Antilles and attempted to forge closer ties between the islands, as is exemplified by the adoption of an anthem of the Netherlands Antilles in 2000. A new referendum on Sint Maarten, which was in favour of a separate status for Sint Maarten as a country within the Kingdom of the Netherlands, sparked a new series of referendums across the Netherlands Antilles, however.

Results

See also
Dissolution of the Netherlands Antilles
2000 Sint Maarten status referendum
2004 Saban status referendum
2005 Curaçao status referendum
2005 Sint Eustatius status referendum

References

Referendums in Bonaire
Referendums in the Netherlands Antilles
2004 in Bonaire
2004 referendums
Bonaire 
September 2004 events in North America